Thomas Fischer (born 7 February 1986) is a German freestyle skier. He was born in Bad Reichenhall. He competed in ski cross at the World Ski Championships 2013, and at the 2014 Winter Olympics in Sochi, in ski-cross.

References

External links 
  (freestyle)
  (alpine)
 
 
 

1986 births
Living people
Freestyle skiers at the 2014 Winter Olympics
German male freestyle skiers
Olympic freestyle skiers of Germany
People from Bad Reichenhall
Sportspeople from Upper Bavaria
21st-century German people